Grab is an unincorporated community in Green, Kentucky, United States.

A post office was established in the community in 1906, with store-owner Daniel K. Cramer, postmaster. The origins of the name Grab are unclear. Some believe it refers to Cramer's practice of selling candy by the handful, while others believe it describes the activity of shoplifters in the country store.

References

Unincorporated communities in Green County, Kentucky
Unincorporated communities in Kentucky